The network sole (Achirus scutum) is a sole of the genus Achirus native to the eastern Pacific from the tip of Baja California and the southeastern Gulf of California to northern Peru. It is found at depths 5–45 m in coastal lagoons and fresh water. Its diet consists of crustaceans, small fishes, polychaetes, and occasionally detritus.

References

Achiridae
Fauna of the Baja California Peninsula
Western Central American coastal fauna
Fish of Colombia
Fish of Ecuador
Fish described in 1869
Taxa named by Albert Günther